Humberto Lara (12 October 1900 – 1957) was a Chilean hurdler. He competed in the men's 400 metres hurdles at the 1924 Summer Olympics.

References

External links
 

1900 births
1957 deaths
Athletes (track and field) at the 1924 Summer Olympics
Chilean male hurdlers
Olympic athletes of Chile